Hosur taluka is a taluka of Krishnagiri district of the Indian state of Tamil Nadu. The headquarters is the City of Hosur. This taluk consists of 76 Revenue Villages

Demographics
According to the 2011 census, the taluk of Hosur had a population of 539,668 with 277,529 males and 262,139 females. There were 945 women for every 1,000 men. The taluk had a literacy rate of 67.65%. Child population in the age group below 6 years were 31,619 males and 30,142 females.

Villages in the taluk of Hosur

See also
Abaya Hastha Swayambu Sri Lakshmi Narasimha Swamy Temple, Agaram Village, Hosur

References 

Taluks of Krishnagiri district